is a passenger railway station located in the city of Kakogawa, Hyōgo Prefecture, Japan, operated by West Japan Railway Company (JR West).

Lines
Kanno Station is served by the Kakogawa Line and is 4.8 kilometers from the terminus of the line at

Station layout
The station consists of two ground-level opposed side platforms, connected to the station building by a footbridge. The station is unattended.

Platforms

History
Kanno Station opened on 1 April 1913.

Passenger statistics
In fiscal 2019, the station was used by an average of 1057 passengers daily

Surrounding area
 Kakogawa Kita Civic Center
 Kitayama Park / Saijo Temple Ruins (National Historic Site)
 Saijō Kofun Cluster (National Historic Site)

See also
List of railway stations in Japan

References

External links

  

Railway stations in Hyōgo Prefecture
Railway stations in Japan opened in 1913
Kakogawa, Hyōgo